This is a list of entertainment media that is part of the Ace Attorney franchise.

Video games

Main series

Spin-offs

Compilations

Soundtracks

Printed media
The Official Gyakuten Saiban Manga
The Weekly Serialized Gyakuten Saiban Manga
Turnabout Crossover
Phoenix Wright: Ace Attorney Official Casebook: Vol. 1: The Phoenix Wright Files
Phoenix Wright: Ace Attorney Official Casebook: Vol. 2: The Miles Edgeworth Files
Gyakuten Saiban: Turnabout Idol
Gyakuten Saiban: Turnabout Airport

Theatre
Ace Attorney: Truth Resurrected
Ace Attorney 2: Truth Resurrected Again
Ace Attorney 3: Prosecutor Miles Edgeworth

Movies and Television
Ace Attorney
Ace Attorney

References

 
Mass media by franchise
Media lists by video games franchise